Passacaille records is a Belgian classical music record label, owned by Musurgia BVBA, based in Halle, Belgium. The company's artistic director is the flautist and flute-maker Jan De Winne.

Notes

References 

Classical music record labels